Code Name: Viper, known in Japan as , is an action-platform video game developed by Arc System Works and published by Capcom in 1990 for the Nintendo Entertainment System. The player takes control of a special forces operative who must combat a drug syndicate in South America.

Plot
The player takes the role of Kenny Smith, code name "Viper", an agent of the 98th Special Forces. He is assigned by his superior, Commander Jones, to investigate a large drug syndicate that covers most of South America (Venezuela, Brazil, Chile, Peru, Paraguay, Argentina, Bolivia). Smith's objective is to rescue a missing agent in each of the syndicate's seven hideouts and uncover clues of the Syndicate's true mastermind.

Gameplay

The gameplay system is similar to Namco's 1986 arcade game Rolling Thunder, specifically its own NES version. Like in Rolling Thunder, the player can jump or drop down between floors by holding the directional pad up or down and pressing the jump button, as well as enter doors to obtain power-ups or avoid enemies. The player can be armed with one of two weapons (a standard issue pistol or a fully automatic machine gun for continuous firepower). Items includes additional ammunition for either weapon, extra health, a time extension, and extra lives. Unlike Rolling Thunder, the player can shoot while jumping and can also change directions during midair.

Another difference between Rolling Thunder and Code Name: Viper is the added emphasis on rescuing hostages, like the also-similar Shinobi.  Throughout the first seven stages, the player can find captured civilians, who will offer the player their gratitude, behind certain doors. To complete each of the first seven stages, the player must rescue a captured commando who will provide the grenades necessary to blow up the obstruction blocking the exit at the end of each stage and advance the plot.

Per Rolling Thunder, the strength and attack patterns of the standard enemy soldiers that the player will face is determined by the colors of their outfit, and "strange" enemies, such as Snipers, Frogmen, and Maniacs, appear later on.  There are a total of eight stages, with three difficulty settings.

Reception
The game received a score of 60 in Famitsu.

Notes

References

External links

Code Name: Viper at GameFAQs

1990 video games
Capcom games
Nintendo Entertainment System-only games
Platform games
Run and gun games
Side-scrolling video games
Video games developed in Japan
Video games set in South America
Nintendo Entertainment System games
Video games scored by Yoko Shimomura
Drugs in popular culture
Single-player video games